Bruce, Canada may refer to:

 Bruce, Alberta, a hamlet in Alberta, Canada within Beaver County
 Bruce County, Ontario, a county in Southwestern Ontario, Canada
 Bruce (Ontario provincial electoral district), a provincial riding in Ontario, Canada (1934-1967 & 1987–1999)

See also
 Bruce—Grey—Owen Sound, a federal electoral district in Ontario, Canada
 South Bruce, Ontario,  a municipality in Bruce County, Ontario, Canada
 South Bruce Peninsula, a town at the base of the Bruce Peninsula of Ontario, Canada, in Bruce County between Lake Huron and Georgian Bay